Eix is a commune in the Meuse department in Grand Est in north-eastern France. Eix or EIX may also refer to:

Eix Transversal, a highway in Catalonia, Spain. It crosses the
Vauxhall Wyvern EIX, a 1950s automobile
NYSE symbol of Edison International, a California public utility holding company